Group A of UEFA Women's Euro 2017 contained Belgium, Denmark, Netherlands and Norway. The matches were played from 16 to 24 July 2017.

Teams

Standings

In the quarter-finals:
The winners of Group A, Netherlands, advance to play the runners-up of Group B, Sweden.
The runners-up of Group A, Denmark, advance to play the winners of Group B, Germany.

Matches
All times are local (UTC+2).

Netherlands vs Norway

Denmark vs Belgium

Norway vs Belgium

Netherlands vs Denmark

Belgium vs Netherlands

Norway vs Denmark

References

External links
Official website

Group A